Essentra PLC is a supplier of plastic and fibre products. The company operates internationally from headquarters in Milton Keynes, Buckinghamshire. It is listed on the London Stock Exchange and is a constituent of the FTSE 250 Index.

History
The company was established in Jarrow in the 1940s as the Fibres division of Bunzl. In 1955 it acquired Moss Plastics, a plastic products manufacturer, in 1994 MSI Oilfield Products, a pipe protection business, and in 1996 it bought Payne, a manufacturer of tear tapes.

In 1997 the Bunzl Fibres division bought Filtrona Corporation, a US filter technology specialist which it had demerged in 1984. At this time the Filtrona name was adopted for the enlarged Bunzl Fibres business. The company bought Enitor, a Dutch extruder business, in 1998 and Skiffy Group, a Dutch nylon parts business in 2004.

The company was demerged from Bunzl in 2005. It went on to buy Duraco, a US adhesive coated products business in 2007. In 2008, the company purchased Lendell Manufacturing, a foam manufacturer. The foam and fiber businesses were combined into a new division and named Filtrona Porous Technologies.

On 26 June 2013, the company formally rebranded to Essentra plc. Then-Chief Executive, Colin Day said that the company chose the name Essentra “to capture what each of Filtrona’s businesses manufacture and supply: small but essential key components that play critical roles for our customers”. On 31 October 2016, Essentra announced that Paul Forman would succeed Day as Chief executive, effective 1 January 2017.

Operations 
The company is organised as follows:
Components Solutions
Specialist Components
Packaging
Filter Products

References

External links
 Official Site

Companies based in Milton Keynes
Plastics companies of the United Kingdom
Companies listed on the London Stock Exchange
Bunzl